Crystalloluminescence is the effect of luminescence produced during crystallization. The phenomenon was first reported in the 1800s from the rapid crystallization of potassium sulfate from an aqueous solution.

References

Luminescence
Light sources